Seth Numrich (born January 19, 1987) is an American stage, television, and film actor.

Early life
Numrich was born in Minneapolis. He studied at The Juilliard School graduating in acting in 2006 with Group 36 in acting. 

He was a teaching artist for "Artists Striving to End Poverty" [ASTEPonline.org] from 2005 to 2012.

Career

Theatre
A Juilliard School graduate in drama, Numrich has been part of Rising Phoenix Repertory from 2005 onwards and takes part in many other theater groups as well.

Numrich made his Broadway debut as Lorenzo in the 2010 revival of The Merchant of Venice and has played the boxer Joe Bonaparte in Golden Boy and as Albert in War Horse both at the Lincoln Center Theater on Broadway. He has also acted off Broadway like in Slipping, Yosemite and Blind as part of Rattlestick Playwrights Theater program, in Too Much Memory, Favorites and Break Your Face on My Hand with Rising Phoenix Repertory, On the Levee and Iphigenia 2.0 with Signature Theatre. Other roles include Gates of Gold with 59E59 and Dutch Masters with LAByrinth and regionally in The History Boys, The Cure at Troy, Measure for Measure and The Judgment of Paris.

In 2018, Numrich appeared in Travesties on Broadway with the Roundabout Theatre Company.

In 2013, he starred in Sweet Bird of Youth by Tennessee Williams opposite Kim Cattrall at the theatre The Old Vic in the West End, London.

Film and television
On screen, Numrich is known for his lead role as cadet Sam Singleton/Romeo in Private Romeo, a 2011 film adaptation of Shakespeare's Romeo and Juliet directed by Alan Brown. He won award for "Outstanding Actor in a Feature Film" during 2011 L.A. Outfest collectively with five other actors from the same film. 

Numrich is also known for his role as Benjamin Tallmadge in AMC's series Turn: Washington's Spies, which ran from 2014 to 2017.

Audiobooks
In 2021, Numrich read Stephen King's novel Later (novel) as an unabridged audio-production.
In 2022, he read Stephen King's novel Fairy Tale (novel) as an unabridged audio-production.

Theatre credits
He has acted on and off Broadway and in regional and international venues including:
Theatre (Broadway)
The Merchant of Venice as Lorenzo 
Golden Boy as boxer Joe Bonaparte (Lincoln Center Theater at the Belasco Theatre)
War Horse as Albert (Lincoln Center)
Travesties as Tristan Tzara 
Theatre (London)
Sweet Bird of Youth as Chance Wayne (The Old Vic)
Theatre (Off Broadway)
Rattlestick Playwrights Theater: 
Slipping as Eli
Yosemite as Jake
Afghanistan Zimbabwe America Kuwait 
Blind as Oedipus
Rising Phoenix Rep
Too Much Memory 
Favorites
Break Your Face on My Hand 
Signature
On the Levee as poet Will Percy 
Iphigenia 2.0 as Achilles
59E59
Gates of Gold as Ryan
LAByrinth
Dutch Masters
 
Theatre Regional, International
The History Boys as Dakin (Ahmanson Theatre)
The Cure at Troy as Neoptolemus (Seattle Rep)
Measure for Measure as Duke (Chautauqua Theatre Company)
The Judgment of Paris (NYC Fringe Festival / Edinburgh Fringe Festival)
 The Glass Menagerie (Edinburgh International Festival)

Film acting
2002: How to Kill a Mockingbird as Kevin
2011: Private Romeo as Sam Singleton / Romeo (lead role in feature film)
2016: Macbeth: Unhinged as Macduff
2016: Imperium as Roy

TV
2010: Gravity as Adam Rosenblum (TV series, 10 episodes) 
2012: The Good Wife as Randy Chapman in episode "Here Comes the Judge" (TV series)
2014–2017: Turn: Washington's Spies as Benjamin Tallmadge (TV series)
2017: Homeland as Nate Joseph (TV series)
2019: Madam Secretary as Griffin (TV series)
2022: Under the Banner of Heaven as Robin Lafferty (Hulu series)
Voice over
2008/2010: Independent Lens in episode "Blessed Is the Match: The Life and Death of Hannah Senesh" as voice of Giora Senesh/Sándor Fleischmann (in 2008 documentary film and 2010 TV documentary series)

References

External links

American male stage actors
American male film actors
Juilliard School alumni
1987 births
Living people
Male actors from Minneapolis
21st-century American male actors